Shane Kerrison (born 28 March 1965) is a former Australian rules footballer who played for Collingwood in the Australian Football League (AFL). He was a late inclusion in Collingwood's team for the 1990 Grand Final, replacing Alan Richardson, and was one of the best afield in the Pies' victory over Essendon. Wearing the number 44 jumper throughout his career, Kerrison retired at the end of 1995, but remained as a runner for Collingwood in the ensuing years.

External links

Australian rules footballers from Melbourne
1965 births
Living people
Collingwood Football Club players
Collingwood Football Club Premiership players
Victorian State of Origin players
One-time VFL/AFL Premiership players